Men, Women, and Chain Saws: Gender in the Modern Horror Film is a non-fiction book by American academic Carol J. Clover, published in 1992. The book is a cultural critique and investigation of gender in slasher films and the appeal of horror cinema, in particular the slasher, occult, and rape-revenge genres, from a feminist perspective. Although these films seem to offer sadistic pleasure to their viewers, Clover argues that these films are designed to align spectators not with the male tormentor, but with the female victim—the "final girl"—who finally defeats her oppressor. The book was nominated for the Bram Stoker Award for Best Non-Fiction in 1992.

References

External links
 
 

1992 non-fiction books
American non-fiction books
Books about film
English-language books
Princeton University Press books
Gender in horror film
Non-fiction books about horror